Ana Francisco (born 19 September 1980) is a Portuguese swimmer. She competed in three events at the 1996 Summer Olympics.

References

1980 births
Living people
Portuguese female swimmers
Olympic swimmers of Portugal
Swimmers at the 1996 Summer Olympics
Place of birth missing (living people)